Ostrov is a village and municipality in Piešťany District in the Trnava Region of western Slovakia.

History
In historical records the village was first mentioned in 1431.

Geography
The municipality lies at an altitude of 166 metres and covers an area of 9.358 km². It has a population of about 1154 people.

Trivia

'Ostrov' is the Slovak word for island.

References

External links
http://www.statistics.sk/mosmis/eng/run.html

Villages and municipalities in Piešťany District